This is a list of properties and districts in Walton County, Georgia that are listed on the National Register of Historic Places (NRHP).

Current listings

|}

Former listings

|}

See also
National Register of Historic Places listings in Georgia (U.S. state)

References

Walton
Walton County, Georgia